Tevyn Walcott (born 25 November 1994) is a Barbadian cricketer. He made his first-class debut for Barbados in the 2017–18 Regional Four Day Competition on 4 January 2018. He made his List A debut for Barbados in the 2017–18 Regional Super50 on 13 February 2018. In October 2019, he was selected to play for Barbados in the 2019–20 Regional Super50 tournament.

References

External links
 

1994 births
Living people
Barbadian cricketers
Barbados cricketers
Place of birth missing (living people)